Cyperus tomaiophyllus is a species of sedge that is native to parts of Africa.

See also 
 List of Cyperus species

References 

tomaiophyllus
Plants described in 1895
Flora of Cameroon
Flora of Ethiopia
Flora of Kenya
Flora of Madagascar
Flora of Malawi
Flora of Nigeria
Flora of Rwanda
Flora of Tanzania
Flora of Uganda
Flora of the Republic of the Congo
Taxa named by Karl Moritz Schumann